Gérard J. Roubichou, a Frenchman who was born in Marseilles on July 11, 1939, and resides in Paris, France, has made significant contributions to French culture and language in various assignments as an educator, administrator, diplomat, and as an art and literary critic in France and abroad, namely in the USA.

After graduating in 1963 from École Normale Supérieure de la rue d'Ulm in Paris as an Agrégé de lettres classiques, he taught in Amiens (France).

In 1966–1967 he was invited by the University of California, Berkeley to teach contemporary French literature, primarily the French Nouveau Roman (New Novel). In August 1967, he was appointed as a lecturer in French language by the French government at Moscow Lomonosov University in the former Soviet Union, to train Russian teachers of French. In 1969, he returned to the US when he was offered an assistant professorship at the University of Virginia, in Charlottesville. In the spring of 1973, he was appointed in New Orleans, Louisiana, by the French Ministry of Foreign Affairs as cultural attaché for seven southern states. In cooperation with the local authorities on joint projects, he oversaw cultural, educational and French language training programs, primarily CODOFIL in Louisiana.

There, he completed, for the University of Lausanne, Switzerland, his doctoral dissertation on Claude Simon, the French novelist who was not very well known in the 1960s and 1970s. His dissertation, which was the first scholarly work in French on Simon in Europe, was published into a book in 1976. Simon was awarded the Nobel Prize in literature in 1985.

Roubichou was promoted in August 1976 to Deputy Cultural Counselor of the French Embassy in the US, in residence in New York City. His mission was to facilitate partnerships between universities and other institutions in France and in the US, and foster exchanges of rising and established French and American leaders in various fields, ranging from the Arts and allied fields, the Humanities, Social Sciences and Economics.

Early in 1981, he was transferred to Paris within the French Ministry of Foreign Affairs, (Quai d'Orsay), as an Advisor to the Director of Cultural, Scientific and Technical Relations (DGRCT) in charge of all French cultural, educational, scientific and research programs worldwide, and in 1982, he joined a team of diplomats at the Inspection Générale of the Quai d'Orsay, which was responsible for overseeing the operations of French Embassies, including the network of about 400 French schools abroad.

In 1985, he was honored as a Knight, in the French National Order of Merit, and in March 1986, he was appointed as Advisor in the Cabinet of the French Minister of Foreign Affairs. In May 1989, he was elected president, chief executive officer, of the Lycée Français de New York, an American institution founded in 1935 whose mission was to provide children of French expatriates, American families and children from many nations a French curriculum with a solid American component. From 1995 until 2001, he was also President of the Société des Professeurs Français et Francophones en Amérique (SPFFA), an American foundation established in 1904 in New York City.

In recognition of his contributions and long-term commitment to French culture and education in France, in the United States and abroad, he was appointed as an Officer of the Palmes Académiques in 1993 and received as a Knight in the National Order of the French Legion of Honor in 1994.

During his second stay in New York, he was a regular voluntary contributor in France-Amérique. He wrote the first article in French about the American sculptor Seward J. Johnson Jr. whom he had met in the 1970s. In 2003, he wrote the first in-depth study of Seward Johnson's "impressionist" works in three-dimensions, inspired by French Impressionists, which were and still are installed at Grounds For Sculpture in New Jersey.<ref>Grounds For Sculpture- 80 Sculptors Way, Hamilton, NJ 08619 https://www.groundsforsculpture.org</ref>

In 2002, the Quai d'Orsay had appointed him head of a team of five French independent experts to conduct an evaluation of the French comprehensive policy of cooperation between France and Bulgaria, from 1991 to 2001. In 2004, he joined the French section of the Franco-British Council and was its Secretary General from 2006 to 2011.

In 2011 he was elected Secretary General of the Comité d'Aménagement du 7ème Arrondissement , in Paris and since 2016, he has been its president. At the request of The Seward Johnson Atelier (TSJA), in New Jersey, he translated from French into English Créatures de Bronze, sculptures de Seward Johnson, a book which he had written in France in 2017 on the artist Seward Johnson and, in 2019, updated versions of the book were released successively in the US by TSJA - in English in April, and in French in December, shortly before Seward Johnson's death, on March 10, 2020.

In April 2021, he published D'un Mur à l'autre, a book covering the history of Le Mur pour la Paix'', a monument installed in 1999 on the Champ de Mars in Paris, and scheduled to be installed differently on the Avenue de Breteuil in Paris, in 2021, a project strongly challenged through a petition signed and endorsed by nearly 10,000 residents. He is currently very active on various projects envisioned by the City of Paris, focusing currently on the Champ de Mars, the Trocadéro and the Eiffel tower.

Books

Selected articles in scholarly publications

References

1939 births
Living people